"Radio" is a song by Irish folk rock band the Corrs. It was released in October 1999 from the band's live album The Corrs Unplugged, recorded on 5 October 1999 during their appearance on MTV Unplugged, with "Dreams" from the same album as a B-side.

The song was originally slated for their previous album Talk on Corners but was shelved after failing to develop a suitable arrangement at the time. An "electric" version appeared on their next studio album In Blue. The single became a chart hit, reaching the top 20 in Ireland, New Zealand, and the United Kingdom. The song was also a modest adult contemporary hit in Canada, reaching number 64 on the RPM Adult Contemporary chart.

Background

According to Sharon Corr, the Unplugged and In Blue versions of the song were the third and fourth versions respectively to be recorded. The Unplugged version was modeled after the first acoustic demo they had recorded, while the In Blue version was a remake of the second early "dance" version. Caroline Corr stated that after she felt there was little to experiment with on the Unplugged version, the band's programmer suggested adding synthesizers and experimenting with different electric guitar licks for the In Blue version. The Corrs recorded the entire Unplugged album on 5 October 1999 at Ardmore Studios in Bray, Ireland.

Music video
The video for "Radio" is pieced together from the "Unplugged" session at the MTV studios.

Track listings
UK CD and cassette single; European and Australasian CD single
 "Radio" (edit) – 4:15
 "Dreams" (unplugged) – 3:43
 "Radio" (album version) – 5:00

UK 7-inch single
A. "Radio" (edit) – 4:15
B. "Dreams" (unplugged) – 3:43

Personnel
Personnel are lifted from the UK CD single liner notes.

The Corrs
 Andrea Corr – lead vocals, tin whistle
 Caroline Corr – drums, piano, bodhrán, vocals
 Sharon Corr – violin, vocals
 Jim Corr – guitar, piano, vocals

Additional musicians
 Anthony Drennan – guitar, Dobro
 Keith Duffy – bass, guitar, percussion
 The Irish Film Orchestra – additional instrumentation

Production
 Fiachra Trench – orchestral arrangement
 Bob Clearmountain – mixing
 Bob Ludwig – mastering
 Elizabeth Barrett – art direction
 Andrea Brooks – artwork design
 Kevin Westenberg – artwork photography

Charts

Release history

References

143 Records singles
1999 singles
1999 songs
Atlantic Records singles
The Corrs songs
Lava Records singles
Song recordings produced by Mitchell Froom
Songs written by Sharon Corr